Soundtrack for the Voices in My Head: Volume 03 is the third production-based and sixth overall studio album by the American electronic rock artist, Celldweller. It is the third album in the Soundtrack for the Voices in My Head series.

Production
Like Wish Upon a Blackstar and Soundtrack for the Voices in My Head Vol. 02, SVH Vol. 03 was released in Chapters.

It was hinted already in February 2013, but it was formally announced on Klayton's Facebook page on May 9, 2013. The album was revealed in an advertisement placed by Position Music at The Golden Trailer Awards. The first song that Klayton mentioned from the album was "Down to Earth", but it is not included on Chapter 01, but rather in Chapter 2 of End of an Empire.

Release

Chapter 01
Information about Chapter 01 was first posted on The Orchard. Alongside the cover art, it was revealed by the website that the first Chapter will include four tracks and will be released on July 16, 2013. On June 26, 2013, Klayton announced that the first Chapter of the album would be released earlier, on July 2, 2013, exclusively on iTunes, while it would be released on the previous release date on other online stores, including FiXT Store. The FiXT Store release includes two alternate song versions and a Limited Edition CD of 150 hand numbered copies.

Track listing

References

Celldweller albums
2013 albums